The 2009 Karjala Tournament took place in Finland from 5 November to 8 November. The tournament is a part of the 2009–10 Euro Hockey Tour.

Russia won the tournament for fourth year in a row, before Finland and Sweden.

Standings

Results 
All times local

References

2009–10 Euro Hockey Tour
2009–10 in Swedish ice hockey
2009–10 in Russian ice hockey
2009–10 in Finnish ice hockey
2009–10 in Czech ice hockey
Karjala Tournament
2009
November 2009 sports events in Europe
2000s in Helsinki
Sports competitions in Jönköping